Sihem Boughdiri Nemsia (Arabic: سهام بوغديري نمصية ) is a Tunisian banker and politician. She has been Minister of Finance in the Bouden Cabinet in August 2021. 

She refused to cover her head when she took the oath of office, breaking with tradition.

References 

1965 births
Living people
Female finance ministers

Women government ministers of Tunisia
Finance ministers of Tunisia
21st-century Tunisian politicians
21st-century Tunisian women politicians
Independent politicians in Tunisia
Women bankers